Depressaria altaica is a moth of the family Depressariidae. It is found in Russia (Altai mountains).

References

Moths described in 1854
Depressaria
Moths of Asia